Sissano is an Austronesian language spoken by at most a few hundred people around Sissano in West Aitape Rural LLG, Sandaun Province, Papua New Guinea. 4,800 speakers were reported in 1990, but the 1998 tsunami wiped out most of the population.

Phonology

Vowels

Consonants

References

Critically endangered languages
Schouten languages
Languages of Sandaun Province